Day camps  also known as summer camps in some areas, are geared for those who are of school ages 3-7.  They offer activities in a social setting, usually in the community and the children return home in the evenings. Day camps can be booked by the day or by the week, or month depending on the institution organizing them.

Format 
Day camps focus on topics such as art, music, science, nature or sports, although some caregivers also use it as a substitute for daycare. Many families enroll their children in day camps during the summer so that they have supervision during the day. Camps foster children's emotional, social, and physical and creative growth through various interactive activities and relationships with role model counselors. Generally camps focus on children with the exception of specialized camps that aim to develop specific skill sets which are directed at campers up through adolescence years.

Sports-focused day camps are designed for younger athletes or for high-energy kids who may need a positive outlet for their energy.

Day camps are less expensive than sleepaway camps (e.g., summer camps), because they often do not entail as many or any meals or as much supervised time each day. Some day camps are located at the same site as a resident camp with the same resources and activities to serve local campers along with kids from abroad. Many day camps are located in city parks, sport complexes, schools or community centers such as a YMCA or Boy Scouts or by government organizations.

Recreational day camps are camps in which one would be able to sign up for through the township they live in. Recreational day camps cost significantly less than privately owned because they are funded by the township it is located in. Private Day camps are able to have bigger campuses on a private location and charge what they want to.

Cost 
The cost of day camps according to the American Camp Association, day camps that are ACA accredited are typically ranges from
anywhere to $201 to $400 a week for day camps, depending on the type of camp that it is. Day camps which are sometimes run by nonprofit organizations are usually the most affordable they start as low as $100 a week and can range to $500. For-profit camps can cost anywhere up to $300-$500 a week.  Privately owned or specialized day camps can be a variety of specialty camps that teach the children specific skills. Because of the one on one attention that the child gets, prices will be much higher than other day camps. These prices could range from $500 to $1,000 per week.

Education 
Day camps teach children an abundance of skills that they can utilize. Campers are able to learn independence through day camps because children are going to be responsible for changing themselves, making sure they are aware of where their belongings are and deciding what they want to eat for the day. Day camps educate children on new skills that they are able to see from the professionals working at the day camps and also from their peers. With the set of new skills that the child has from day camp they are also able to gain courage for trying new things.

Camps as a whole are recognized by child development professionals as places where children are able to learn how to create relationships with friends that they would be less likely to make in other settings. Day camps teach children how to mature socially, emotionally, intellectually and physically. Camps give children a sense of community of their own. Day camps educate young people on how to discover their talents, interests and values more extensively than in other settings such as school.

References

Summer camps